This article is a list of shoguns that ruled Japan intermittently, as hereditary military dictators, from the beginning of the Asuka period in 709 until the end of the Tokugawa shogunate in 1868.

Asuka / Heian periods (709–1184)

Note: there are different shogun titles. Sakanoue no Tamuramaro was the second, and Minamoto no Yoritomo was third person who had the title of Sei-i Taishōgun.

Kamakura shogunate (1192–1333)

Timeline

Kenmu Restoration (1333–1336)

Ashikaga shogunate (1336–1573)

Timeline

Azuchi–Momoyama period (1568–1600)

The following were military dictators of Japan, de facto shoguns from 1568 to 1598. They unified the country, which at the start were a chaotic patchwork of warring clans.

From 1598 to 1600, the de facto shogunate was delegated to the Council of Five Elders.

Tokugawa shogunate (1600–1868)

Timeline

Notes

See also
 Emperor of Japan
 List of emperors of Japan
 History of Japan
 Daimyo
 Han system
 Abolition of the han system

References

Bibliography
 Friday, Karl (2007). The First Samurai: The Life and Legend of the Warrior Rebel, Taira Masakado. John Wiley and Sons. .

Shogun
Military ranks of Japan
Government of feudal Japan
Lists of Japanese people
Japan history-related lists
Titles of national or ethnic leadership